Miss Polo International 2019 was the 2nd edition of Miss Polo International pageant, held on 14 September 2019 at Jumeirah Zabeel Saray, Dubai, United Arab Emirates.

Contestants from 30 countries participated in this year's Miss Polo International pageant, surpassing the previous record of 17 contestants in the inaugural 2018 event.

Results

Placements

Continental queens

Special awards

Contestants 
30 contestants competed for the title of Miss Polo International 2019.

 – Lorena Lopez
 – Krystyna Vysotska
 – Emmanuella Kone
 – Sylvia Anya Nkenku
 – Sandra Marcela Diaz
 – Viviana Quinonez
 – Chloe Nicole
 – Marina Eva Rolgeyzer
 – Eunice Frempng-Manso
 – Jean Dorothy
 – Arnitha Damparala
 - Dewanti Kumala
 – Diana Akoth Aluko
 – Natasha Antionette Benson
 – Karina Jankelevic
 – Graciela Natali Castro
 – Laura Herman
 – Joanne Ayrra Averilla
 – Precious Okoye
 – Lucy Lyasheva
 – Chloe Bella
 – Diallo Mamadou Ramata
 – Nazimizye Adam Mdolo
 – Atitiya Benjapak
 – Sandra Zemaityte
 – Olya Popova
 – Yosdany Navarropai
 – Alissa Christie
 – Tina Shinga
 – Letwin Tatenda Tiwaringe

References

2019 beauty pageants